Parasoft Virtualize is a service virtualization product that can create, deploy, and manage simulated test environments for software development and software testing purposes. These environments simulate the behavior of dependent resources that are unavailable, difficult to access, or difficult to configure for development or testing. It simulates the behavior of dependent resources such as  mainframes, ERP systems, databases, web services, third-party information systems, or other systems that are out of direct developer/tester control.
The product is used in conjunction with hardware/OS virtualization to provide developers and testers with the resources they need to execute their development and testing tasks earlier, faster, or more completely. Its technologies for automating continuous testing are used as part of continuous delivery, continuous integration, and continuous release.

Background
In 2002, Parasoft released technology to "create service implementation stubs which emulate critical functionality that cannot be made available for testing.". This technology was introduced in Parasoft SOAtest.  Since 2002, the technology was extended with "intelligent stubs [that] emulate the behaviour of a running system, allowing the developer to test services in the context of an application's actual behaviour and not on the live running system.". In 2009, the technology was extended with "application behavior virtualization," which can "create copies of both applications and back-end systems so a developer can reference such applications or systems when developing software."
The technology was extended and released as a separate product in 2011.

Parasoft created a free community edition in 2017 that allows individual users and small projects to use service virtualization at no cost.

Industry recognition
Parasoft Virtualize was awarded the 2012 Jolt Awards Grand Prize by a panel of Dr. Dobb's Journal-appointed judges. This annual award showcases products that have  "jolted" the industry with their significance and made the task of creating software faster, easier, and more efficient. The most recent awards/recognitions received were being named "leader in functional and test automation tools" in Forrester's Functional Test Automation Tools evaluation  and "innovation and technology leader" in voke's Service Virtualization Market Mover Array.

See also

 Service virtualization
 Automated testing
 Software testing
 Agile software development
 Software performance testing

References

Web service development tools
Software testing tools